HQ2 may refer to:

 HQ2, a musical duo comprising producers/remixers Hex Hector and Mac Quayle
 The Amazon HQ2, a second headquarters for the American company, Amazon